Henry Salgado is the executive chef of Barcelona Wine Bar in Nashville, Tennessee and a past nominee for the James Beard Award.

Career
Henry Salgado was born in Tampa, Florida. Salgado began his restaurant career as a busboy and later became a corporate trainer for a national chain restaurant. He was educated at the Florida Culinary Institute in West Palm Beach, Florida. Salgado worked at Max's Grill in Boca Raton, Florida, Hotel La Valencia in San Diego, California and at the Horseradish Grill in Atlanta, Georgia before he and his wife opened the Spanish River Grill in New Smyrna Beach, Florida in 1999. The Spanish River Grill specializes in modern Spanish cuisine, influenced by Salgado's Cuban heritage.

ISalgado was a finalist for the Best Chef South for James Beard Award in 2012 and 2014 James Beard Award.

References

External links
 Biography at Spanish River Grill

Living people
American restaurateurs
People from Tampa, Florida
Year of birth missing (living people)
Chefs from Tennessee